United States Coast Guard Station Gloucester is a United States Coast Guard station located in Gloucester, Massachusetts. It is located on Harbor Loop on the Mainland.  The first successful US Coast Guard Air Station was CGAS Ten Pound Island in Gloucester Harbor, which operated from 1925 to 1935.

The station has three assets: two 47′ MLB and an RBS2. In order to respond to "SAR" search and rescue in heavy weather the 47 MLB is utilized. Gloucester's "AOR" (area of responsibility) also includes narrow rivers and harbors, which the RBS is utilized over the 47 to gain entry into shallow waters.

Many books and movies have revolved around the station, most notably; "10 Hours Until Dawn" and the story of Andrea Gail and her crew was the basis of the 1997 book The Perfect Storm by Sebastian Junger, and a 2000 film.

See also 
 The Perfect Storm (book)
 The Perfect Storm (film)
 1991 Halloween blizzard
 List of military installations in Massachusetts

References

External links
New man in change at Coast Guard station
Station information

Buildings and structures in Gloucester, Massachusetts
United States Coast Guard stations
Military installations in Massachusetts
1977 establishments in Massachusetts